Humberg is the name of two hills in the Palatinate Forest:

 Humberg (Hochspeyer)
 Humberg (Kaiserslautern)

Humberg also refers to:

 Humberg Metall- & Kunstguss, a German metal-working firm